The Burrup Peninsula rock gehyra (Gehyra peninsularis) is a species of gecko in the genus Gehyra. It is endemic to Western Australia. It was first described in 2018.

References

External links 

 Gehyra peninsularis occurrence data at GBIF

Gehyra
Reptiles described in 2018
Geckos of Australia